Henry Connor is the name of:
Henry Conner (b 1837), a member of the Wisconsin State Senate
Henry Connor (botanist) (1922–2016), New Zealand botanist
Henry G. Connor (1852–1924), North Caroline state senator and state superior court judge
Henry William Connor (1793–1866), U.S. Representative from North Carolina